El amor es un juego extraño ("Love is a Strange Game") is a 1983 Mexican film. It was directed by Luis Alcoriza.

External links
 

1983 films
Mexican drama films
1980s Spanish-language films
Films directed by Luis Alcoriza
1980s Mexican films